Archaeophya adamsi, commonly known as Adam's emerald dragonfly or horned urfly, is a species of dragonfly belonging to the family Gomphomacromiidae.
This is an Australian endemic and one of the rarest dragonflies in the country. It breeds in rivers and streams in coastal areas of Queensland and New South Wales.

Nymphs of this species grow to 23 mm in length and live among rocks and detritus along stream margins. They can be identified by the distinctive two-lobed frontal plate on the head. The nymph lives for around 7 years. The adult is a fairly large and robust dragonfly, blackish brown with narrow yellow rings. The adult probably only lives for a few months.

Gallery

Note
There is uncertainty about which family Archaeophya adamsi best belongs to: Gomphomacromiidae, Synthemistidae, or Corduliidae.

References

Gomphomacromiidae
Odonata of Australia
Endemic fauna of Australia
Taxa named by Frederic Charles Fraser
Insects described in 1959